Prophet is an independent record label based in Memphis, Tennessee, formerly owned by DJ Paul and Juicy J. As a group act, Prophet Entertainment goes by the stage name Prophet Posse. From 1991 to 1994 it launched new independent musical artists linked mainly to the strands of American music such as crunk, Hip hop, Gangsta rap, Southern Hip Hop and Horrorcore. As of 2009, the label is assumed defunct.

History
DJ Paul, Juicy J, along with Nick Scarfo, founded Prophet in 1991. Three 6 Mafia would release the original Mystic Stylez and Chapter 1: The End on the label. DJ Paul and Juicy J would soon have a falling out with Nick Scarfo and as a result, left Prophet and founded their own label Hypnotize Minds, taking Three 6 Mafia with them. Nick Scarfo bought artist Indo G out of his contract with Hypnotize Minds for $120,000 and would go on to sue DJ Paul and Juicy J, though they ended up settling all matters out of court.

In early 2000 some former members of the original Prophet returned to the label. And in 2007, Nick Scarfo relaunched Prophet and would go on to release a new album featuring the original Prophet Posse called “The Return”. Some original Prophet and former Hypnotize Minds members such as Gangsta Boo, T-Rock, K-Rock, Koopsta Knicca, and Lil Pat would work with Prophet Posse. The last Prophet release was "Hood U.S.A.", in 2008. Nick Scarfo died on August 7, 2015.

Original line-up

Prophet Posse

 DJ Paul
 Juicy J
 Lord Infamous
 Koopsta Knicca
 Crunchy Black
 Gangsta Boo
 La Chat 
 Project Pat
 Kingpin Skinny Pimp 
 Indo G
 Playa Fly
 Scan Man
MC Mack
 M-Child
 T-Rock
 Gangsta Blac
 Killa Klan Kaze
 K-Rock
 Droopy Drew Dog
 Nigga Creep
 Lil Gin
 Lil Glock
 S.O.G.
 Cyde Manson

Re-launched line-up

New Prophet Posse

 Nick Scarfo (CEO)
 Kelo The Work
 Hott Sauce
 K-Rock
 Playa Fly
 Indo G
 Kingpin Skinny Pimp 
 M-Child
 Gangsta Blac
 Droopy Drew Dog
 Lil' Pat
 Pop-a-Lock
 Killa Kev
 Raw Dawg
 Hardiss (Germany)
 Young Juve
 Grandmarkee|Devil Eyez 
 Milk|Etha 
 OMG|Orange Mound Gangsta
Cyde Manson/Homicide

Discography

See also
 List of record labels

References

External links

Official website

https://web.archive.org/web/20090531145318/http://www.prophetposse.net/SmInterview.htm

 
American record labels
American independent record labels
Record labels established in 1991
1991 establishments in Tennessee
Gangsta rap record labels
Hip hop record labels
Horrorcore record labels